The Long Weekend (O' Despair) is a 1989 American drama film directed by Gregg Araki and starring Brett Vail. The film follows three couples, one gay, one lesbian and one heterosexual, spending a weekend together.

Cast
 Bretton Vail as Michael
 Maureen Dondanville as Rachel
 Andrea Beane as Leah
 Nicole Dillenberg as Sara
 Marcus D'Amico as Greg
 Lance Woods as Alex

Production
Araki shot The Long Weekend in black and white on a budget of $5,000.

Reception
The New York Times reviewer Vincent Canby congratulated Araki for making an attractive-appearing film on a minuscule budget but found the film hard to watch. Faulting the film's "extremely self-conscious, neo-sitcom dialogue", Canby felt that Araki's ingenuity as a filmmaker was not matched by his talent.

The Long Weekend (O' Despair) won the 1989 Los Angeles Film Critics Association Independent-Experimental Award.

References

External links
 

1989 films
American black-and-white films
Films directed by Gregg Araki
1989 LGBT-related films
American LGBT-related films
LGBT-related drama films
1989 drama films
1980s English-language films
1980s American films